Stenoptilia nolckeni is a moth of the family Pterophoridae. It is found in Kyrgyzstan, Kazakhstan, Finland and northern Russia. It has also been recorded from Korea and China.

The wingspan is about 18 mm.

References

nolckeni
Moths described in 1869
Plume moths of Asia
Plume moths of Europe